MF is an Italian national daily business newspaper owned by Class Editori, founded in 1989. Milano Finanza is an Italian national weekly business newspaper also owned by Class Editori, sold with MF every Saturday since 1986. The newspapers are very popular among the business operators of online trading.

References

External links
  

1989 establishments in Italy
Business newspapers published in Italy
Class Editori
Italian-language newspapers
Newspapers published in Milan
Newspapers established in 1989
Daily newspapers published in Italy